The Central District of Deyr County is in Bushehr province, Iran. At the 2006 census, its population was 39,119 in 8,095 households. The following census in 2011 counted 42,765 people in 10,363 households. At the latest census in 2016, the district had 40,970 inhabitants living in 11,095 households.

References 

Districts of Bushehr Province
Populated places in Deyr County